Cayo South is an electoral constituency in the Cayo District represented in the House of Representatives of the National Assembly of Belize since 2012 by Julius Espat of the People's United Party.

Profile

The Cayo South constituency was created for the 1961 general election as part of a major nationwide redistricting. The largely rural constituency consists of approximately two-thirds of the Cayo District, stretching north and east from the Guatemalan border in the west up to the border with the Orange Walk District in the north. Cayo South is geographically the largest constituency in the country.

Prior to 2008 Cayo South included the Belizean capital city, Belmopan, after which the city was represented by its own constituency.

Area Representatives

Elections

References

British Honduras Legislative Assembly constituencies established in 1961
Political divisions in Belize
Cayo South
1961 establishments in British Honduras